is a Japanese former professional baseball catcher who played in Nippon Professional Baseball (NPB) from 1986 to 1999, and again from 2001 to 2002. He is currently a battery coach for the Yokohama DeNA BayStars.

References

1965 births
Living people
Baseball people from Osaka
Japanese baseball players
Nippon Professional Baseball catchers
Kintetsu Buffaloes players
Chunichi Dragons players
Yomiuri Giants players
Chiba Lotte Marines players
Yokohama BayStars players
Japanese baseball coaches
Nippon Professional Baseball coaches